Tranquility Base is the site on the Moon where, in July 1969, humans landed and walked on a celestial body other than Earth for the first time. On July 20, 1969, Apollo 11 crewmembers Neil Armstrong and Buzz Aldrin landed their Apollo Lunar Module Eagle at approximately 20:17:40 UTC. Armstrong exited the spacecraft six hours and 39 minutes after touchdown, followed 19 minutes later by Aldrin. The astronauts spent two hours and 31 minutes examining and photographing the lunar surface, setting up several scientific experiment packages, and collecting  of dirt and rock samples for return to Earth. They lifted off the surface on July 21 at 17:54 UTC.

Tranquility Base was named by Aldrin and Armstrong, and first announced by Armstrong when the Lunar Module Eagle landed. It is located in the south-western corner of the dark lunar plain Mare Tranquillitatis ("Sea of Tranquility"). The U.S. states of California and New Mexico have registered Tranquility Base as a heritage site associated with them, but Texas, the U.S. National Park Service, and UNESCO have declined to do so, due to the technicality that it is not located within their borders.

Site selection
For more than two years, NASA planners considered a collection of 30 potential sites for the first crewed landing. Based on high-resolution photographs taken by the Lunar Orbiter spacecraft, and photos and data taken by the uncrewed Surveyor landers, this list was narrowed down to five sites located near the lunar equator. They ranged between 45 degrees east and west, and 5 degrees north and south of the center of the Moon's facing side. They were numbered 1 to 5, going from east to west.

The automated targeting system was taking Eagle toward what Armstrong described as a "football-field sized crater, with a large number of big boulders and rocks for about one or two crater diameters around it", which he avoided by assuming manual control and flying a bit farther downrange. The landing was still within the target ellipse.

Name

Armstrong named the site at 20:17:58 UTC, approximately 18 seconds after his and Aldrin's successful landing, as he announced:
Houston, Tranquility Base here. The Eagle has landed.

During training, Armstrong and Aldrin had exclusively used the callsign "Eagle" in simulated ground conversations, both before and after landing. Armstrong and Aldrin decided on using "Tranquility Base" just before the flight, telling only Capsule Communicator Charles Duke before the mission, so Duke would not be taken by surprise.

The name has become a permanent designation for the site. Although the name was designated by the Apollo astronauts, the International Astronomical Union officially recognizes the designation "Tranquility Base". It is listed on lunar maps as Statio Tranquillitatis, conforming to the standard use of Latin for lunar place names.

Status

About 100 artificial objects, as well as footprints left by Armstrong and Aldrin, remain at Tranquility Base, and Armstrong commented that during the launch of Eagle'''s ascent stage he could see "Kapton and other parts on the LM staging scattering all around the area for great distances." The descent stage of the Lunar Module remains at the original point of landing.  According to Aldrin (with apparent confirmation from later Lunar Reconnaissance Orbiter photos), the US flag planted at the site during their moonwalk was blown over by the ascent rocket exhaust, but remains on the surface of the Moon.  A laser reflector was placed at the site to allow precise ongoing measurements of the distance to the Moon from Earth. A solar-powered seismometer was also left to measure moonquakes, but this stopped functioning after 21 days. A disc containing the Apollo 11 goodwill messages was left at the site, and various gear that was no longer needed for the return phase of the mission—including Aldrin's boots—was left behind to lighten the craft for return to lunar orbit.

As the site of the first human landing on an extraterrestrial body, Tranquility Base has cultural and historic significance. The U.S. states of California and New Mexico have listed it on their heritage registers, since their laws require only that listed sites have some association with the state. Texas has not granted similar status to the site, despite the location of Mission Control in Houston, as its historic preservation laws limit such designations to properties located within the state.  The U.S. National Park Service has declined to grant it National Historic Landmark status to avoid violating the Outer Space Treaty's prohibition on any nation claiming sovereignty over any extraterrestrial body. It has not been proposed as a World Heritage Site since the United Nations Educational, Scientific and Cultural Organization (UNESCO), which oversees that program, limits nations to submitting sites within their own borders.

Interest in according the site some formal protection grew in the early 21st century with the announcement of the Google Lunar X Prize for private corporations to successfully build spacecraft and reach the Moon; a $1 million bonus was offered for any competitor that visited a historic site on the Moon. One team, led by Astrobotic Technology, announced it would attempt to land a craft at Tranquility Base. Although it canceled those plans, the ensuing controversy led NASA to request that any other missions to the Moon, private or governmental, human or robotic, keep a distance of at least  from the site.

In 2020, the One Small Step to Protect Human Heritage in Space Act was enacted, protecting Tranquility Base and other Apollo landing sites from damage from US-licensed space activity.

Gallery

 In popular culture 
Tranquility Base has been depicted in many films and television shows, such as in the 1998 mini-series From the Earth to the Moon, the 2015 series The Astronaut Wives Club, and the 2018 film First Man.

Tranquility Base is referenced in "Boat on the River" (". . . all roads lead to Tranquility Base...") by the American Rock band Styx, from their 1979 album Cornerstone.Tranquility Base is referenced in indie rock band Arctic Monkeys' 2018 album, Tranquility Base Hotel & Casino'', as the location of a hotel and casino.

See also
Apollo 11 lunar sample display
Apollo 11 in popular culture
List of archaeological sites beyond national boundaries
Moonbase
Space archaeology
Statio Cognitum, the Apollo 12 landing site
Tranquility (ISS module), namesake

Notes

External links
Surface panorama of landing site (by Armstrong), Lunar and Planetary Institute
USGS Planetary Gazetteer Entry
Photo Number IV-085-H1, Digital Lunar Orbiter Photographic Atlas of the Moon, showing the Apollo 11 landing site and vicinity

Apollo 11
Apollo program
Exploration of the Moon
LQ12 quadrangle
Geological type localities
Buzz Aldrin
Neil Armstrong
1969 on the Moon
Articles containing video clips